Minooka station was a Chicago, Rock Island and Pacific Railroad station in Minooka, Illinois. It was the highest point on the Rock Island Line and was originally called Summit. The town was later renamed by settler Dolly Smith, to Minooka, a word in the Pottowatomi language possibly meaning "high point", "place of contentment", "good Earth" or "place of the maples." Additional translations of the word may be "good land” or “high place.” CSX Transportation runs freight trains on the New Rock Subdivision with Iowa Interstate trackage rights.

References

Former railway stations in Illinois
Former Chicago, Rock Island and Pacific Railroad stations
Transportation buildings and structures in Grundy County, Illinois